The 1907 North Carolina Tar Heels football team represented the University of North Carolina and indepdepent during the 1907 college football season. Led by Otis Lamson in his first and only season as head coach, North Carolina compiled a record of 4–4–1. The team's captain was Joseph S. Mann.

Schedule

References

North Carolina
North Carolina Tar Heels football seasons
North Carolina Tar Heels football